The 2018 FC Cincinnati season was the club's third season of existence, and their third in the United Soccer League (USL). It was FC Cincinnati's second season as a second-tier team in the U.S. soccer pyramid, as the United States Soccer Federation provisionally promoted the USL from Division III to Division II for the 2017 season. FC Cincinnati played in the Eastern Conference of the USL.

This was the final season of the club's USL incarnation. On May 29, 2018, Major League Soccer awarded the FCC ownership group an expansion franchise, which began play in MLS under the FC Cincinnati name in 2019.

On September 26, 2018, the club clinched their first USL Regular Season Championship with a 4–1 victory over the Richmond Kickers.

Club

Coaching staff

Roster 

On October 25, 2017, general manager Jeff Berding held a press conference to make the first announcements about the 2018 roster. The return of nine players from 2017 was confirmed at this press conference: Matt Bahner, Kenney Walker, Danni König, Corben Bone, Jimmy McLaughlin, Garrett Halfhill, Justin Hoyte, Sem de Wit, and Josu. Six additional players from the 2017 roster—Austin Berry, Mitch Hildebrandt, Djiby Fall, Harrison Delbridge, Andrew Wiedeman, and Paul Nicholson—were mentioned as still under consideration for 2018, pending contract discussions and future announcements. Berding also confirmed they would not renew contracts or exercise options for any other former players. In the following weeks, Djiby Fall implied he would not be returning via Twitter, and Paul Nicholson announced his retirement from professional soccer.

The club began announcing new signings in November 2017. The team signed Israeli defender Dekel Keinan on November 10, as well as Canadian forward Daniel Haber on November 15.

On April 16, 2018, the club announced they had mutually agreed to part ways with defender Josu.

On April 17, 2018, the club announced they had reach an agreement for the free release of defender Garrett Halfhill. Halfhill subsequently join the New York Cosmos B of the NPSL.

On July 9, 2018, the club announced the free transfer of forward Daniel Haber to Ottawa Fury FC.

On July 30, 2018, forward Fanendo Adi was acquired from the Portland Timbers as the first MLS designated player for FC Cincinnati. The club also announced the acquisition of midfielder Fatai Alashe from the San Jose Earthquakes.

On August 1, 2018, the club announced the acquisition of defender Pa Konate from Serie A S.P.A.L.

Where a player has not declared an international allegiance, nation is determined by place of birth.

Competitions

USL

Results Table

|text_H=Home|text_A=Away

Standings

References 

2018 USL season
American soccer clubs 2018 season
FC Cincinnati
2018